Kursk is a city in Russia.

Kursk may also refer to:
 Kursk Oblast, a federal subject of Russia
 Kursk crater, a meteorite impact crater in Russia
 Kursk Magnetic Anomaly
 Battle of Kursk, the 1943 World War II battle that was Germany's last major offensive in the east and one of the largest tank battles in history
 Kursk (board game), a 1980 board wargame that simulates the battle
 Our Lady of Kursk, an Eastern Orthodox icon
 KYPCK, a Finnish metal band
 Russian submarine Kursk
 Kursk submarine disaster (2000)
 Kursk (play), a play inspired by the sinking of Kursk
 Kursk (film), a film by Thomas Vinterberg, inspired by the sinking of Kursk

 Kursk (inhabited locality), several inhabited localities in Russia

See also
 Kursky (disambiguation)